Daniël Ferdinand van de Vyver  (14 December 1909 – 18 March 1977) also known as "Vandie", was a South African rugby union player.

Playing career
He also played thirteen tour matches for the Springboks, scoring four tries.

Test history

See also
List of South Africa national rugby union players – Springbok no. 250

References

1909 births
1977 deaths
South African rugby union players
South Africa international rugby union players
People from Raymond Mhlaba Local Municipality
Rugby union fly-halves
Rugby union players from the Eastern Cape
Western Province (rugby union) players